The Drunengalm (or Drunegalm) is a mountain of the Bernese Alps, located between Diemtigen and Reichenbach im Kandertal in the Bernese Oberland.

References

External links
 Drunengalm on Hikr

Mountains of the Alps
Mountains of Switzerland
Mountains of the canton of Bern
Two-thousanders of Switzerland